Rising Star is an international singing reality competition television franchise based on the Israeli singing reality competition television series HaKokhav HaBa (meaning "The next star") (Hebrew: הכוכב הבא) which is produced by Keshet Broadcasting Ltd. The program format lets viewers vote for contestants via mobile apps. It has become a rival to the Idols franchise, The Voice and The X Factor.

Format
In contrast to other singing competition TV shows which feature a cast of celebrity judges, Rising Star features a cast of celebrity experts and considers the viewers at home the judges. During each performance, the audience at home is able to decide in real time whether or not a contestant is sent through to the next round by using a mobile voting app.
	
While the viewers at home are considered the "judges", the expert panelists also may influence the vote but with continuously decreasing percentage votes over the total public vote and not exceeding 7% of the total voting power.

Auditions
Acts are not pre-announced, and names are called randomly from their waiting room where they are assembled. Only a limited number of the contestants in waiting get the chance of actually performing during the show that day. As a reportage of the randomly announced performer is shown, viewers are invited to register for voting for that specific act. As the candidate makes to the stage, the host has a very brief conversation with him/her. With a countdown of three seconds, the candidate has to start performing behind a screen called "The Wall". With start of performance, the voting kicks in. Registered voters have the option of voting just "yes" or "no". Non-votes are also considered "no" votes. If a panelist  (excluding the host) votes "yes", another 7% is added to the tally of the contestant. The contestants also see random photos of voters in their favour. Faces of panelists voting "yes" will also be shown in much larger frames. Once the contestant reaches 70% of "Yes" votes, the wall is raised and the contestant goes to the next round of the competition.

Duels
Contestants who make it through the auditions are paired by the experts to face off in a duel. The first contestant to sing, chosen by a coin toss before the show, sings with the wall up and sets the benchmark for the second contestant. The second contestant sings with the wall down. If the second contestant betters the first contestant's vote total, the wall rises and the second contestant is through to the next round while the first contestant is eliminated; if the second contestant fails to raise the wall, the second contestant is eliminated and the first contestant is through.

Eliminations and final
After the duel rounds, half the contestants perform with the wall up, after which the contestant with the lowest vote total is placed in the "hot seat". The subsequent contestants perform with the wall down, and they have to better the vote total of the contestant in the hot seat to raise the wall. If they succeed in doing so, the contestant in the "hot seat" is eliminated, the contestant with the next lowest vote total is placed in the hot seat, and the performing contestant is provisionally qualified; otherwise, the performing contestant is eliminated if they fail to raise the wall. This continues until the remaining contestants with the lowest number of votes are eliminated. In this stage, each panelist's vote counts as 5%.

The quarterfinals and semifinals follow the same format, except with a lower weightage of the panelists' votes of 3% in quarterfinals and 1% in the semifinals as the number of contestants goes down.

During the finale, contestants are paired into a duel. The first contestant sings with the wall up and sets the "benchmark" for the second contestant. The second contestant sings with the wall down. If the second contestant gets the higher percentage of votes, then the wall rises and the second contestant moves onto the next round of duels. However, if the second contestant's percentage is lower than the first contestant's, the wall stays down and the contestant is eliminated. In the second round, the two contestants that moved on will duel against each other with their second song. The same process applies for this round, except the running vote total is not revealed, both contestants sing with the wall up. The contestant with the higher vote percentage becomes the winner of Rising Star.

Finally, each coach will have his/her best contestant left standing to compete in the finals, singing an original song. From these four, one will be named "Rising Star"—and will receive the grand prize of a recording contract. Warner Music Group is the general record company associated and affiliated with the Rising Star format in most countries.

Rising Star around the world
After the success of the Israeli series in 2013, many television stations throughout the world bought the rights and started broadcasting similar series. Most notable of such stations were the American television network ABC which began airing its first series in June 2014 live from Los Angeles in the Eastern, Central, & Mountain time zones. The US edition was also carried in Canada, with advertising simultaneous substitution and voting access on CTV. The American version lasted a full 10-episode season before getting canceled due to low viewership.

Another major broadcaster RTL Television launched a German language version in Germany. After the show experienced low ratings during its first few episodes, RTL Television cancelled Rising Star Germany and reduced the season's length to 7 episodes; the winner was determined through a special finale event rather than a full season.

In the United Kingdom, ITV bought the rights, but cancelled its scheduled launch due to lower-than-expected viewership in similar launches in the United States and Germany.

French television channel M6 launched its own version in September 2014, keeping the title Rising Star. Following a highly rated first episode on 25 September 2014, the show's ratings declined drastically; this caused the show to be cancelled midway through its first and only season (the final episode aired two weeks earlier than scheduled). Italian broadcaster Canale 5 bought the rights for its version of Rising Star, which was cancelled during development for unknown reasons.

Other broadcasters that adapted the series include Argentinian Telefe as Elegidos (La música en tus manos), Brazilian Rede Globo as SuperStar, Chinese CCTV-3, Greek ANT1 as Rising Star, Hungarian TV2 as Rising Star, Indonesian RCTI and MNCTV as Rising Star Indonesia and Rising Star Dangdut respectively, Portuguese TVI as Rising Star: A próxima estrela, Russia-1 as Артист (Artist), and Turkish broadcaster TV8 as Yükselen Yıldız. Of these versions, only the Brazilian and Indonesian versions aired for more than two seasons; the Brazilian version was canceled after three seasons because of declining viewership.

International versions
 Franchise with a currently airing season
 Franchise awaiting confirmation
 Franchise with an unknown status
 Franchise with an upcoming season
 Franchise no longer in production
 Franchise that was cancelled during development

References

 
Singing talent shows
Talent shows
Television franchises